Working Class Dog is the fifth studio album by Australian rock musician Rick Springfield, released by RCA Records in 1981. The album was certified Platinum in the United States and eventually sold over three million US copies.  It produced Springfield's biggest career hit with the #1 million-selling song, "Jessie's Girl".  Springfield was awarded the 1982 Grammy Award for Best Rock Vocal Performance, Male.

The album was re-released on CD in 2006 as a "25th anniversary edition" with three bonus tracks.

"Love Is Alright Tonite" was used to comedic effect in the film Wet Hot American Summer.

Track listing
All tracks written by Rick Springfield except as indicated.

Album cover
The album cover features a picture of a Bull Terrier dog dressed in a white shirt with a black tie. The dog was Rick's pet named Ronnie, who died in 1994.  The album cover (credited to Mike Doud) was nominated for a Grammy Award for "Best Album Package" in 1981.  The 2011 Jonathan Coulton song "Je Suis Rick Springfield" makes reference to the album cover. The dog was also used in the cover art of Springfield's next album Success Hasn't Spoiled Me Yet.

Personnel
 Rick Springfield - vocals, guitar, bass, keyboards
 Robben Ford - guitar
 Neil Giraldo - guitar, bass
 Gabriel Katona - keyboards
 Jeff Eyrich - bass
 Mike Baird - drums
 Jack White - drums
 Jeremiah Cox - French horn, background vocals
 Tom Kelly - background vocals

Credits
Produced by Rick Springfield, Bill Drescher and Keith Olsen
Engineered by Bill Drescher, Chris Minto and Doug Pakes at Sound City
Mastered by Greg Fulginiti at Artisan Sound Recorders

Charts

Weekly charts

Year-end charts

Certifications

References

1981 albums
Rick Springfield albums
Albums produced by Keith Olsen
RCA Records albums
Albums recorded at Sound City Studios